Larry V. Starcher (September 25, 1942 – December 24, 2022) was an American jurist who was justice of the Supreme Court of Appeals of West Virginia. In November 1996, he was elected as a Democrat in a partisan election to the Supreme Court of Appeals. He served as chief justice in 1999 and 2003.

Education 
A native of Roane County, West Virginia, Starcher earned his Bachelor of Arts in 1964 from West Virginia University and his Juris Doctor in 1967 from the West Virginia University College of Law.

Legal career 
Prior to being elected as a circuit judge of Monongalia County in 1976, he served as an assistant to the Vice-President for Off-Campus Education at WVU, as director of the North Central West Virginia Legal Aid Society, and as a private lawyer. He served as circuit judge for 20 years (1977-1996), including 18 as chief judge. While sitting as a circuit judge, Starcher served as a special judge in 23 of West Virginia’s 55 counties. He presided over the trial of 20,000 asbestos injury cases and a six-month state buildings asbestos trial.

In November 1996, he was elected to the Supreme Court of Appeals as a Democrat in a partisan election. He served as chief justice in 1999, and 2003. He promoted action in several areas of judicial administration, specifically: court facilities committee; public trust and confidence in the judiciary; mental hygiene commission; court technology summit; self-represented litigants task force; state law library improvements; and reactivated the gender fairness task force.

Starcher had been highly critical of the actions of the executive of a coal company who had business before the court, which led to him recusing himself in at least some decisions involving that company. He criticized a fellow Justice who won election with large contributions from the coal company executive and then cast deciding votes in favor of the company. The situation led to a U. S. Supreme Court case, Caperton v. A.T. Massey Coal Co., about when judges should recuse themselves.

Death
Starcher died on December 24, 2022, at the age of 80.

Awards and associations 
Starcher was president of the West Virginia Judicial Association in 1992 and 1993. As a trial judge, he was active in the area of juvenile justice, including establishing alternative learning centers for youths at risk and a youth shelter. He also pioneered the use of work-release and community service as punishment for nonviolent offenders. He was a regular instructor at judicial conferences, and was honored by many civic and community groups, including the NAACP, Jaycees, Trial Lawyers, and Probation Officers. In 1978, he was a Fellow of the National Endowment for the Humanities at Harvard University. Starcher also served as an adjunct lecturer at the West Virginia University College of Law from 1992.

In Volume 111, Issue 2 (January 2009) the west Virginia University College of Law Law Review published Starcher's article, "A Judicial Philosophy: People-Oriented Justice." The article describes Starcher's life to date and his judicial philosophy,and contains extensive quotes from his judicial writing.  In the article he says, " I have been involved with almost all of the law's many facets. As a trial judge, I served as a presiding judge in twenty-three of our state's fifty-five counties, conducted hundreds of jury trials, and decided many thousands of legal disputes. I have sent men and women to prison for life, and I have nurtured community-based sentencing efforts. From determining the division of assets in
a divorce, to crafting a constitutional test for the delegation of legislative powers, I have used the tools of precedent and logic, filtered through the practical psychology that guides much of the law's reasoning, on a daily basis. My life in
the law has given me an informed perspective on human nature-on its potential for good and evil, for brilliance and stupidity-that is afforded by few disciplines. I have seen the majesty of the law; and I have at times seen its pettiness. It has been an extraordinary experience."

A copy of the article is at https://researchrepository.wvu.edu/cgi/viewcontent.cgi?article=1347&context=wvlr.

References

1942 births
2022 deaths
20th-century American judges
20th-century American lawyers
21st-century American judges
Chief Justices of the Supreme Court of Appeals of West Virginia
Justices of the Supreme Court of Appeals of West Virginia
Lawyers from Morgantown, West Virginia
People from Roane County, West Virginia
Politicians from Morgantown, West Virginia
West Virginia circuit court judges
West Virginia lawyers
West Virginia University alumni